Zolling is a municipality in the Bavarian district of Freising.
Associated villages are: Anglberg, Flitzing, Thann, Palzing, Oberappersdorf, and Appersdorf.

Zolling lies 6 km to the north of Freising.

Gallery

References

Freising (district)